Zuzana Hejnová (born 19 December 1986) is a retired Czech athlete who specialised in the 400 metres hurdles. She won the silver medal in the event at the 2012 London Olympics. Hejnová is a two-time World Champion, having claimed titles at the 2013 and 2015 World Championships in Athletics. She won bronze at the 2012 European Championships and silver for the 400 metres at the 2017 European Indoor Championships.

At age 16, Hejnová earned the gold medal in her specialist event at the 2003 World Under-18 Championships to take a silver at the 2004 World U20 Championships. She also won bronze and gold at the 2003 and 2005 European U20 Championships respectively. She is a two-time Diamond League 400 m hurdles winner. Hejnová is the Czech record holder for the 400 m hurdles, and also holds national best in the 300 m hurdles. She is a four-time Czech outdoor champion (400 m, 400 m hurdles) and an eight-time national indoor champion (200 m, 400 m, pentathlon).

Her sister, Michaela, is also an Olympic athlete.

Junior
In 2003, Zuzana Hejnová competed at the 2003 World Youth Championships in Athletics at Sherbrooke, Canada and won the gold medal in the 400-metre hurdles with a time of 57.54. A year later, she returned at Grosseto, Italy at the 2004 World Junior Championships. This time she won the silver with a time of 57.44 in the 400 m hurdles, defeated by the Russian, Ekaterina Kostetskaya, who won gold by a large margin at 55.55 seconds.

Her current personal bests are 14.11 in the 100m achieved at Ostrava on 3 September 2005; 13.77 in the 100 metres hurdles at Stará Boleslav on 13 June 2003; 53.04 in the 400 m at Kladno on 28 June 2008; and 54.90 in the 400 m hurdles recorded at Monaco on 28 July 2009.

Career

2008

In early March 2008 Hejnová competed in the 400 metres at the 2008 IAAF World Indoor Championships and reached the semi finals but did not qualify to reach the final. She did however, reach the final with the Czech relay team in the 4 × 400 metres relay in a team which included her, Zuzana Bergrová, Denisa Ščerbová, and Jitka Bartoničková. They finished 4th, with a time of 3:34.53, but were over 5 seconds slower than the Americans who took bronze with a time of 3:29.30.

On 21 June 2008, she competed for the Czech Republic at the 2008 European Cup in Athletics.

Hejnová competed in the 400 metres hurdles at the 2008 Beijing Olympics. She qualified for the second round with the thirteenth fastest overall time of 55.91 seconds and for the final with 55.17. In the final she finished seventh with 54.97, only one hundredth behind her personal best at the time.

2011
She won the 400 metres hurdles at the European Team Championships with a new national record of 53.87 seconds.
On 8 July 2011 she improved her national record to 53.29 seconds.

2012
At the 2012 London Olympics, Hejnová won originally the bronze medal for the women's 400 m hurdles, behind the winner, Russia's Natalya Antyukh, and Lashinda Demus of the United States.

In 2019, following a re-test of doping samples, Antyukh was disqualified with all her results 2013 onward deleted but her 2012 Olympic results were not affected. In October 2022, Antyukh's results from 15 July 2012 on were retroactively voided. In December, it was announced that she had been stripped of her title and Demus would be upgraded to gold in her place, with Hejnová then second.

2013
Hejnová won Diamond League races over 400 m Hurdles in Shanghai (53.79), Eugene (53.70), Oslo (53.60), Paris (53.23 NR), and London (53.07 NR). She also won races in Des Moines (54.41), Prague (54.55) and Ostrava (53.32). She secured maximum points for Czech Republic in the European Team Championships First League in Dublin by winning the 400 m in 51.90 seconds. On 15 August 2013 in Moscow, Hejnová became World Champion over 400 m hurdles with a new Czech record (52.83 NR).

2016
Despite winning her semi-final, Hejnová came fourth in the 400-metre hurdles at the 2016 Olympic Games in Rio de Janeiro.

She threatened to sue Czech Post for 1 million koruna over the use of her likeness on a stamp celebrating the 2016 Olympic Games. The Court of Appeal found in favour of Hejnová, leading to Czech Post paying her an undisclosed settlement.

Achievements
All information from World Athletics profile.

International competitions

Circuit wins and titles
 Diamond League overall winner 400 m hurdles (2):  2013,  2015
 400 metres hurdles wins, other events specified in parenthesis
 2011 (2): Oslo Bislett Games, Paris Meeting
 2012 (1): Monaco Herculis
 2013 (7): Shanghai Golden Grand Prix (WL), Eugene Prefontaine Classic (WL), Oslo (SB), Paris (NR), London Anniversary Games (WL NR), Stockholm DN Galan, Zürich Weltklasse
 2015 (4): Paris, London, Stockholm, Zürich
 2017 (3): Rabat Meeting International (SB), Birmingham Grand Prix (SB), Zürich (SB)

National titles
 Czech Athletics Championships
 400 metres: 2006, 2009
 400 m hurdles: 2018, 2020
 Czech Indoor Athletics Championships
 200 metres: 2011
 400 metres: 2005, 2007, 2008, 2009, 2015, 2016
 Pentathlon: 2007

References

External links

 
 
 
 
 
 

1986 births
Living people
Sportspeople from Liberec
Czech female hurdlers
Czech female sprinters
Athletes (track and field) at the 2008 Summer Olympics
Athletes (track and field) at the 2012 Summer Olympics
Athletes (track and field) at the 2016 Summer Olympics
Olympic athletes of the Czech Republic
Olympic bronze medalists for the Czech Republic
European Athletics Championships medalists
Medalists at the 2012 Summer Olympics
World Athletics Championships athletes for the Czech Republic
World Athletics Championships medalists
Olympic bronze medalists in athletics (track and field)
European Athlete of the Year winners
Diamond League winners
World Athletics Indoor Championships medalists
World Athletics Championships winners